Mawson is a surname of both English and Scottish origin it is also prevalent in the Isle of Man. Notable people with the surname include:

Alfie Mawson, English footballer
Andrew Mawson (disambiguation), multiple people
Douglas Mawson (1882–1958), Australian geologist and Antarctic explorer
Gary Mawson, American darts player
Joe Mawson (1905–1959), English footballer
Thomas Mawson, British garden designer and landscape architect
William Mawson (1828–1889), British architect